Bath is a surname. Notable people with the surname include:
Brian Bath (1947–2014), South African cricketer
Chris Bath (born 1967), Australian journalist and television personality
Edwin Bath (1873–1948), Australian politician
Elizabeth Bath (1776–1844), English poet
Elliot Bath (born 1992), English cricketer
Evamaria Bath (born 1929), German actress
Harry Bath (1924–2008), Australian rugby league footballer and coach
Hubert Bath (1883–1945), English film composer and music director
James Bath (headmaster) (1830–1901), South Australian educator and public servant
James R. Bath (born 1936), American businessman
John Bath, British rugby league player
John Morley Bath (1880–1946), South Australian publisher and businessman
Jonas Mohammed Bath, Trinidad community and religious leader
Joyce Bath (1925–2006), Australian cricketer
Melina Bath (born 1966), Australian politician
Michael Bath (born 1966), Royal Navy admiral
Mike Bath (born 1977), American college football coach and former player
Patricia Bath (1942–2019), American ophthalmologist
Patrick Bath, Irish Capuchin friar
Philip Bath (born 1956), British clinician scientist
Raymond Bath (born 1944), South African cricketer
Robert Bath (born 1936), Australian boxer
Ronald J. Bath (born 1944), United States Air Force general
Thomas Bath (1875–1956), Australian politician and trade unionist
Tony Bath (1926–2000), British wargamer

See also
Bathe (surname)
Earl of Bath
Marquess of Bath